In mathematical physics, more specifically the one-dimensional inverse scattering problem, the Marchenko equation (or Gelfand-Levitan-Marchenko equation or GLM equation), named after Israel Gelfand, Boris Levitan and Vladimir Marchenko, is derived by computing the Fourier transform of the scattering relation:

Where is a symmetric kernel, such that which is computed from the scattering data. Solving the Marchenko equation, one obtains the kernel of the transformation operator  from which the potential can be read off. This equation is derived from the Gelfand–Levitan integral equation, using the Povzner–Levitan representation.

See also 

 Lax pair

References
 

Integral equations
Scattering theory